The 1988–89 Southern Football League season was the 86th in the history of the league, an English football competition.

Merthyr Tydfil won the Premier Division and earned promotion to the Football Conference, whilst Coventry Sporting, Wellingborough Town, Mile Oak Rovers, Tonbridge and Ruislip left the league at the end of the season.

Premier Division
The Premier Division consisted of 22 clubs, including 16 clubs from the previous season and six new clubs:
Two clubs promoted from the Midland Division:
Merthyr Tydfil
Moor Green

Two clubs promoted from the Southern Division:
Dover Athletic
Waterlooville

Two clubs relegated from the Football Conference:
Bath City
Wealdstone

League table

Midland Division
The Midland Division consisted of 22 clubs, including 17 clubs from the previous season and five new clubs:
Two clubs relegated from the Premier Division:
Nuneaton Borough
Willenhall Town

Plus:
Ashtree Highfield, promoted from the Midland Combination
Spalding United, promoted from the United Counties League
Tamworth, promoted from the West Midlands League

Also, at the end of the season Forest Green Rovers was renamed Stroud and Ashfield Hightree was renamed Sandwell Borough.

League table

Southern Division
The Southern Division consisted of 22 clubs, including 18 clubs from the previous season and four new clubs:
Two clubs relegated from the Premier Division:
Chelmsford City
Witney Town

Two clubs transferred from the Midland Division:
Buckingham Town
Trowbridge Town

At the end of the season Thanet United reverted name to Margate.

League table

See also
Southern Football League
1988–89 Isthmian League
1988–89 Northern Premier League

References
RSSF – Southern Football League archive

Southern Football League seasons
6